Soapweed or soap weed can refer to:

 Soapweed, California
 Plants:
 Saponaria officinalis
 Yucca elata
 Yucca glauca

See also
 Soapberry
 Soapbush